Jefferson Township is one of thirteen townships in Owen County, Indiana, United States. As of the 2010 census, its population was 1,129 and it contained 525 housing units.

History
Jefferson Township was organized in 1828. It was named for Thomas Jefferson, third President of the United States.

Geography

Unincorporated towns
 Arney at 
 Coal City at 
 Daggett at 
 Hubbell at 
 Stockton at 
(This list is based on USGS data and may include former settlements.)

Cemeteries
The township contains these six cemeteries: Bush, Fiscus, Little John, Neihart, Shouse and Winters.

Major highways
  U.S. Route 231
  Indiana State Road 67

Airports and landing strips
 Von Sloughs Airport

School districts
 Spencer-Owen Community Schools

Political districts
 State House District 46
 State Senate District 39

References
 
 United States Census Bureau 2009 TIGER/Line Shapefiles
 IndianaMap

External links
 Indiana Township Association
 United Township Association of Indiana
 City-Data.com page for Jefferson Township

Townships in Owen County, Indiana
Townships in Indiana